Tom Santi (born November 22, 1985) is a former American football tight end. He was drafted by the Indianapolis Colts in the sixth round of the 2008 NFL Draft, and played two seasons for them. Before that, he played college football at Virginia. In high school, he was a tight end at Montgomery Bell Academy in Nashville, Tennessee.

References

External links

1985 births
Living people
American football tight ends
Indianapolis Colts players
Players of American football from Indianapolis
Players of American football from New Orleans
Players of American football from Virginia
Virginia Cavaliers football players